Hard Candy is the second solo album by Ned Doheny.  It features his version of "Love of Your Own" (written with Hamish Stuart) which was also recorded with Stuart's Average White Band the same year.  The album also includes Doheny's version of his own song “Get It Up for Love” which was originally recorded in 1975 by David Cassidy on his RCA album The Higher They Climb and released by Cassidy as a single. The song was subsequently covered by Maxine Nightingale on her 1977 album Night Life and in 1979 by Táta Vega. Her version was a Top 20 dance single.

Track listing
All tracks composed by Ned Doheny; except where indicated
"Get It Up for Love" - 4:44
"If You Should Fall" - 3:36
"Each Time You Pray" - 3:38
"When Love Hangs in the Balance" - 5:12
"A Love of Your Own" (Ned Doheny, Hamish Stuart) - 3:46
"I’ve Got Your Number" - 3:14
"On the Swingshift" - 3:03
"Sing to Me" - 3:36
"Valentine (I Was Wrong About You)" - 5:06

Personnel
Ned Doheny - vocals, acoustic and lead guitar, backing vocals
Ernie Corello, Steve Cropper - electric guitar
Dennis Parker, Bryan Garofalo, Colin Cameron, Laszlo Wicky, John Heard - bass
David Foster - keyboards, Moog synthesizer
David Garland, Craig Doerge - keyboards
Jimmy Calire - additional piano
Gary Mallaber, John Guerin - drums
Victor Feldman, Steve Forman - percussion
Brooks Hunnicutt, Fleming Williams, Rosemary Butler, Don Henley, Glenn Frey, John David Souther, Linda Ronstadt, Steve Cropper, Hamish Stuart - backing vocals
H. B. Barnum - backing vocals arrangements
Chuck Findley, Greg Adams - horns
Don Menza, Jim Horn, Tom Scott - saxophone
Larry Muhoberac - string arrangement
Technical
Richard Kimball - executive producer

References

External links
"Get It Up for Love" on YouTube
"Love of Your Own" on YouTube

1976 albums
Albums arranged by Larry Muhoberac
Albums produced by Steve Cropper
Columbia Records albums